The  were a class of three oilers of the Imperial Japanese Navy (IJN), serving during the 1920s and World War II.

Construction
The Ondo class was initially planned in 1920 as the six of the Kamoi-class oilers under the Eight-eight fleet final plan. However, of the Kamoi-class oilers, only the Kamoi was completed, due to the conclusion and signing of the Washington Naval Treaty. The other five vessels were then re-planned to the Modified Notoro class.

Out of the five ships, one became the icebreaker , while the other become the food supply ship . Therefore, only three ships were built as Modified Notoro-class (Ondo-class) oilers.

Service in peacetime
They devoted themselves to importing crude oil from North America and Southeast Asia. The crude oil which the Ondo class and the  carried to Japan was 388 sorties; 3,000,000 tons, until 1941.

Service in Pacific War
They were not able to accompany the fleet, because they had low speed. They were engaged in supply duties at naval bases.

Ships in class

Photo

See also
八八艦隊案 (ja)

Bibliography
, History of Pacific War Vol.37, "Support vessels of the Imperial Japanese Forces", Gakken (Japan), June 2002, 
Ships of the World special issue Vol.47, Auxiliary Vessels of the Imperial Japanese Navy,  (Japan), March 1997
The Maru Special, Japanese Naval Vessels No.34, "Japanese auxiliary vessels",  (Japan), December 1979
Senshi Sōsho Vol.31, Naval armaments and war preparation (1), "Until November 1941", Asagumo Simbun (Japan), November 1969

External links
 Hayatomo

World War II naval ships of Japan
World War II tankers
Oilers
Auxiliary replenishment ship classes